Chatsbury is a locality in the Upper Lachlan Shire, New South Wales, Australia. It lies about 33 km north of Goulburn and 22 km south of Taralga on the road from Goulburn to Oberon and Bathurst.

References

Upper Lachlan Shire
Localities in New South Wales